Sam Illo (born 16 February 2001) is an Irish rugby union player, currently playing for United Rugby Championship and European Rugby Champions Cup side Connacht. He plays as a prop.

Connacht
Illo joined Connacht in July 2021 having previously played for the  academy. He made his debut for Connacht in Round 4 of the 2021–22 European Rugby Champions Cup against .

References

External links
itsrugby.co.uk Profile

2001 births
Living people
Irish rugby union players
Rugby union players from Dublin (city)
Connacht Rugby players
Rugby union props